Shiftphone is a modular, easy to repair smartphone brand created by the company SHIFT in Germany. The company emphasizes fair trade and ecology similar to Fairphone. Instead of tantalum capacitors made from coltan, ceramic capacitors are used for their manufacturing. So far, eleven model series have been released. The most recent release was the SHIFT6mq (successor of the Shift6m) in June 2020. The upcoming device will be the SHIFTphone 8, scheduled for release in 2023.

Following the same principles as the phones, a modular 13.3" tablet is also in the works, scheduled for release in 2022. It uses a Tiger Lake i5-processor, features a swappable battery and two M.2 slots, and will support Windows 10 and Linux.

Names
The official company name is SHIFT GmbH.

Model names 
The names of models start with the string "SHIFT" in upper case letter.

Except for the SHIFTphone 8 this is followed by the length of the display diagonal rounded to full inches. After that
 the name ends - for the oldest models
 a dot follows, in turn followed by a number - some newer models until around 2017
 an m follows - this is for the new modular line

OS name 
The OS is named either SHIFT-OS or ShiftOS.

Devices

History 
SHIFT has been developing smartphones since 2014. In the beginning Carsten and his brother Samuel Waldeck realized the project SHIFT7 through German crowdfunding platform . The brothers founded Shift GmbH, a company with limited liability by German law. Further Shiftphones were launched with model series SHIFT4 and SHIFT5 in 2015. The project grew into a small company with 15 employees in Germany, which collaborated with the Chinese production coordinator company "Vstar and Weihuaxin" in Shenzhen. Since 2018 the company has employed 10 workers in their own manufacturing facility in Hangzhou.

Characteristics

Sustainability 
Shiftphones are built in a modular manner to allow the customer to change parts and repair the device without voiding warranty. Videos support the user in repairing their device, explaining how to open it and how to change certain modules.

Circular economy 
Customers have the option, to upgrade their device to a different model.

Workers' care 
Shift employees in China do not work more than 50 hours a week, while it is common for people to work up to 90. Compared to the average Chinese worker in production business, staff is provided with insurances.

Critics and controversies about conflict minerals 
In 2016 c't described the Shift5 as a typical cheap smartphone. Besides, the journal argued that there was no evidence that coltan is not used in Shiftphones and thus criticized the transparency of SHIFT. SHIFT and further secondary sources claim that coltan is not in use for their manufacturing. However, according to c't, the SHIFT partner company "Vstar and Weihuaxin" did not provide information about conflict-free material used in Shiftphone. Unlike Shiftphone, Fairphone provides detailed audit reports about component suppliers through a Chinese agency, and also facilitates detailed information on problems and compromises in the supply-chain.

Coltan is used to make components for mobile phones and other electronic devices. A huge part of the ore is from mines in the DRC (Democratic Republic of Congo). "Much mining has been done in small artisanal mining operations, sometimes known as Artisanal and Small-Scale Mining (ASM). These small-scale mines are unregulated, with high levels of child labor and workplace injury." Some 50,000 children, some just seven years old, work in Congo's coltan mines. Workers often have little or no protection and often work underground in self-made shafts.

Recent reports paint a clear picture: articles by many magazines were able to capture the statements of Carsten Waldeck and prove their credibility accordingly.

For example, golem.de reported in detail on the company and its efforts in terms of sustainability and fairness in June 2018.

The ProSieben magazine Galileo tested the newly released smartphone Shift6m and illuminated, in the form of video recordings, the production conditions of the in-house manufactory located in China in June 2018.

N-tv described the initial efforts for fairness and sustainability as well as the history of the Shiftphone, in September 2018.

In August 2018 the ecology portal  no longer reported any lack of transparency regarding Shift's Chinese hardware manufacturing process.

In the issue 15/2018 the computer magazine c't showed a more positive approach on the topic of German smartphone manufacturer Shift, although the report itself was rather short in comparison to other European hardware providers.

See also 
 Fairphone
 Ethical consumerism
 Fair trade
 Green IT
 Open-source hardware
 Phonebloks
 Framework Computer

References

External links
 Official site

Smartphones
Mobile phone manufacturers
Mobile phone companies of Germany
Modular smartphones
Fair trade brands
Right to Repair
German companies established in 2014
Android (operating system) devices
Companies based in Hesse
German brands